Hinges is a commune in the Pas-de-Calais department in the Hauts-de-France region of France.

Geography
The Canal d’Aire flows around the north-eastern part of the commune.

Population

Places of interest
 The church of St.Marguerite, rebuilt, as was most of the village, after the First World War.
 The Commonwealth War Graves Commission cemeteries.

See also
Communes of the Pas-de-Calais department

References

External links

Official website of the commune 
 The CWGC military cemetery
 The CWGC graves in the communal cemetery

Communes of Pas-de-Calais